Pernastela gnoma, also known as the dwarf pinhead snail, is a tiny species of land snail that is endemic to Australia's Lord Howe Island in the Tasman Sea.

Description
The trochoidal shell of the mature snail is 0.8 mm in height, with a diameter of 1.2–1.3 mm, and a moderate spire. It is golden-brown in colour. The whorls are shouldered and sutures impressed, with moderately spaced radial ribs. It has an ovately lunate aperture and a narrow umbilicus.

Distribution and habitat
The snail is common and widespread across the island, inhabiting plant litter.

References

 
 

 
gnoma
Gastropods of Lord Howe Island
Taxa named by Tom Iredale
Gastropods described in 1944